With Friends Like These is a 2007 Flemish comedy-drama directed by Felix Van Groeningen. The script was written by Felix Van Groeningen and Arne Sierens.

Cast 
 Koen De Graeve as Nick
 Wine Dierickx as Black Kelly
  as Kurt
  as Blonde Kelly
  as Frederic
  as Mother Black Kelly
  as Ingrid

Synopsis 
The lives of a group of friends get disturbed when Black Kelly (named after her hair color) returns from New York where she works in fashion to visit her mother. Her arrival leads to problems for Frederic when his girlfriend Ingrid, who's away on a volleyball tournament, thinks he's having an affair with Kelly after he invites Kelly to stay with him. The two of them reunite with their schooldays gang which includes Nick. Black Kelly discovers that Patrick committed suicide during her absence and Kurt and Blonde Kelly now live together with their one-year-old child. Tension arises among the group after Black Kelly tells Kurt she never told him she was pregnant with their baby before having an abortion. This provokes the already troubled Kurt to run away. The three friends go on a road-trip to find him.

Production 
Filming took place in Sint-Niklaas, Belgium and Auvergne, France.

Release 
The film premiered at the 2007 International Film Festival Rotterdam. The film was released in theatres on March 21, 2007 in Belgium.

References

External links 

2007 comedy-drama films
2007 films
Belgian comedy-drama films
2000s Dutch-language films
Films directed by Felix van Groeningen
Films set in Belgium
Films shot in Belgium
Films set in France
Films shot in France
Dutch-language Belgian films